The 1993 ATP Tour World Championships was a men's tennis tournament that was part of the 1993 IBM ATP Tour. It was the 24th edition of the singles year-end tournament and was held from 16 to 21 November on indoor carpet courts in Frankfurt, Germany. The doubles tournament took place between 24 and 28 November 1993 on hard courts in Johannesburg, South Africa.

Finals

Singles

 Michael Stich defeated  Pete Sampras, 7–6(7–3), 2–6, 7–6(9–7), 6–2

Doubles

 Jacco Eltingh /  Paul Haarhuis defeated  Todd Woodbridge /  Mark Woodforde, 7–6(7–4), 7–6(7–5), 6–4.

References

 
1993